Alcaftadine is used to prevent eye irritation brought on by allergic conjunctivitis. It is a H1 histamine receptor antagonist.

It was approved by the U.S. Food and Drug Administration (FDA) in July 2010, under the trade name Lastacaft.

Pharmacology

Alcaftadine is an antagonist at three of the histamine receptors (1, 2 and 4). The main indication for Alcaftadine is for prevention of allergic conjunctivitis. By blocking these three receptors, Alcaftadine has been shown to significantly reduce the effects of allergens. This effect on histamine receptors seems to show lower rates of itching, eosinophil recruitment and redness after exposure to an allergen. The effect of alcaftadine seemed to reduce the amount of eosinophil cells significantly as compared to olopatadine 0.1%. When animal models were used to test alcaftadine, alcaftadine 0.25% seemed to show superior results for decreasing E-cadherin expression as compared to placebo.  The reduction of E-cadherin means decreased junctions which would lead to progression of allergic conjunctivitis.

Clinical relevance

When Alcaftadine was tested against placebo and olopatadine, only Alcaftadine 0.25% was shown to have a clinically significant reduction in conjunctival redness scores 7 and 15 minutes after administration. When clinical groups where compared to placebo, treatment with all three of the alcaftadine groups (0.05, 0.1 and 0.25%) showed a reduction in secondary endpoints of (lid swelling, conjunctival redness, ocular itching/tearing) as compared to placebo.

Adverse effects

In studies comparing the effectiveness of olopatadine to alcaftadine, there was not a dose response increase of adverse effects as alcaftadine doses increases for 0.05% to 0.1% to 0.25%. The most common seen side effect of alcaftadine administration was irritation or a stinging sensation at the administration site.

Pharmacokinetics

Alcaftadine is typically administrated as an eye drop which keeps its effects regional as compared to systemic effects. The main metabolite of alcaftadine is a carboxylic acid metabolite that has minimal systemic effects. The maximum concentration of its main active metabolite is 0.06 ng/ml at Tmax of 15 minutes. The minimal absorption of alcaftadine, leads to minimal systemic accumulation. The half life of the major metabolite of alcaftadine is two hours after ocular administration. Except for the metabolite, the rest of alcaftadine is excreted unchanged. Since alcaftadine is administrated at a small concentration and at a local site (the eye), it seems to have minimal systemic effects.

Sales

Sales for Alcaftadine from the company Allergan began in July 2010. Since the beginning of sales, Alcaftadine prescriptions have increased until at least March 2012. From the time period of July 2010 until March 2012, cumulative sales have reached 139,000 prescriptions. Out of these 139,000 prescriptions there have been 104,000 unique patients. In March 2012, Alcaftadine exceeded sales of Elestat and this trend may continue as prescribers see the benefit of Alcaftadine and become more comfortable prescribing it.

See also 
 Ketotifen

References

External links 
 

H1 receptor antagonists
Mast cell stabilizers
AbbVie brands
Ophthalmology drugs